India, officially the Republic of India is a country in South Asia. It is made up of 28 states and 8 union territories. All Indian states have their own government and the Union territories come under the jurisdiction of the Central Government. As most of the other countries India too has a national emblem—the Lion Capital of Sarnath.

Apart from India's national emblem, each of its States and Union Territories have their own state seals and symbols which include state animals, birds, trees, flowers etc. A list of state animals of India is given below. See Symbols of Indian states and territories for a complete list of all State characters and seals.

State's

Union territories

See also
 Bengal tiger, the national animal of India
 List of Indian state symbols
 List of Indian state flags
 List of Indian state emblems
 List of Indian state mottos
 List of Indian state songs
 List of Indian state foundation days
 List of Indian state birds
 List of Indian state flowers
 List of Indian state trees

References

External links
 Indian State animals

Animals
Indian state animals
Animals